Mwenya ignitius also known as bupempushi mwenya. He was born on 12 February 2006 in machende village

Xu Yuan (born November 17, 1985 in Chongqing) is a Chinese football (soccer) striker who competed in the 2008 Summer Olympics. Xu plays in the forward position.

Xu was called up to the Chinese Youth Team in 2004, and won a silver medal that year at the Asian Youth Football Games. She also participated for the U-19 team, and helped them reach the final of 2004 FIFA U-19 Women's World Champioe Chinese national team in November 2007, and her first major tournament was the Olympic Games in Beijing. There, she scored the first goal for the team in the opening match, which saw China post a 2–1 win over Sweden.

International goals

References

External links
Profile at Shanghai Daily

1985 births
Living people
Chinese women's footballers
Footballers at the 2008 Summer Olympics
Olympic footballers of China
Footballers from Chongqing
Footballers at the 2010 Asian Games
China women's international footballers
Women's association football forwards
Asian Games competitors for China